Dunalia is a genus of flowering plants belonging to the family Solanaceae.

Its native range is western and southern South America, and it is found in the countries of Argentina, Bolivia, Chile, Colombia, Ecuador and Peru.

The genus name of Dunalia is in honour of Michel Félix Dunal (1789–1856), a French botanist, the genus was published in F.W.H.von Humboldt, A.J.A.Bonpland & C.S.Kunth, Nov. Gen. Sp. Vol.3 on page 55 in 1818.

Known species:
Dunalia brachyacantha 
Dunalia dombeyana 
Dunalia obovata 
Dunalia spathulata 
Dunalia spinosa

References

Solanaceae
Solanaceae genera
Plants described in 1818
Flora of South America